Peristylus chlorandrellus, commonly known as the green ogre orchid, is a species of orchid that is endemic to north-eastern Queensland. It has between four and seven leaves near its base and up to thirty six green flowers with a three-lobed labellum.

Description 
Peristylus chlorandrellus is a tuberous, perennial herb with between four and seven dark green, succulent leaves forming a rosette around the stem. The lateral sepals are a similar size to the dorsal sepal and more or less erect. The petals are about slightly longer and wider than the sepals. Flowering occurs from May to July.

Taxonomy and naming
Peristylus chlorandrellus was first formally described in 2004 by David Jones and Mark Clements and the description was published in The Orchadian. The specific epithet (chlorandrellus) is derived from the Ancient Greek word chloros meaning "green" and aner meaning "a man" with the Latin suffix -ellus meaning "little".

Distribution and habitat
The green ochre orchid usually grows in rainforest and is found in Queensland between the McIlwraith Range and Ingham.

References

Orchids of Queensland
Endemic orchids of Australia
Plants described in 2004
chlorandrellus